Frank Cotter Henderson  (8 March 1911 – 21 July 1969) was an Australian agriculturalist and public servant. He held senior positions in the government of the Territory of Papua and New Guinea and served as an official member of the Legislative Council of Papua and New Guinea and House of Assembly of Papua and New Guinea.

Biography
Henderson was born in 1911 in Broken Hill. After graduating from the University of Sydney with an agricultural science degree, he moved to the Territory of New Guinea in 1936 to become an Agricultural Officer. He initially worked at Kerevat, before being transferred to Talasea. He married Joyce in 1938. Following the Japanese invasion, he helped evacuate civilians, sailing from Talasea to Cairns in Australia. He subsequently served in the RAAF.

He returned to New Guinea after the war, focussing on the development of cocoa plantations. In 1951 he was appointed head of the Division of Plant Industry, moving to Port Moresby the following year. In 1958 he was appointed Director of Agriculture, Stock and Fisheries. He became an official member of the Legislative Council the following year, and was appointed to the new Member of the House of Assembly following the 1964 elections. He was promoted to Assistant Administrator (Economic Affairs) in 1966, also becoming Leader of Government Members in the House of Assembly.

Henderson was made an OBE in 1967. He died in Port Moresby in July 1969 at the age of 58.

References

1911 births
People from Broken Hill, New South Wales
University of Sydney alumni
Australian agriculturalists
Australian public servants
Territory of New Guinea people
Royal Australian Air Force personnel of World War II
Papua New Guinean civil servants
Members of the Legislative Council of Papua and New Guinea
Members of the House of Assembly of Papua and New Guinea
Australian Members of the Order of the British Empire
1969 deaths
Royal Australian Air Force officers